The Cork county football team represents Cork in men's Gaelic football and is governed by Cork GAA, the county board of the Gaelic Athletic Association. The team competes in the three major annual inter-county competitions; the All-Ireland Senior Football Championship, the Munster Senior Football Championship and the National Football League.

Cork's home ground is Páirc Uí Chaoimh, Cork. The current manager is John Cleary.

Cork was the third Munster county both to win an All-Ireland Senior Football Championship (SFC), as well as to appear in the final, following Limerick and Tipperary. The team last won the Munster Senior Championship in 2012, the All-Ireland Senior Championship in 2010 and the National League in 2012.

History
Football has always been seen as the weaker of the two sports in Cork. The game is strongest in the west of the county and in Cork city. Success, especially at senior level, has been much more sporadic that with hurling. The biggest hindrance to success has been the presence of next-door neighbours Kerry. Cork has been the second strongest county in Munster since the 1940s and often one of the best in the country. Many very good Cork teams were unable to overcome Kerry when they met in the Munster final. Cork began the 1970s with three Munster titles in 4 years and the 1973 All-Ireland Senior Football Championship. But they then ran up against the great Kerry team of the 1970s and 1980s. In 1976, the two teams drew in the final of the Munster Senior Football Championship. The replay went to extra-time before two very controversial refereeing decisions saw Kerry victorious. Cork fell back after that for a number of years.

1980s and 1990s
In 1983 Kerry was aiming to capture a record ninth consecutive Munster title; however, Cork pulled off one of their surprise victories. Kerry, however, won the next three Munster and All-Ireland titles. In 1987 Billy Morgan was back with Cork, this time as manager. That year Cork reclaimed the Munster Championship crown from the Kingdom. It was the first of four Munster titles in-a-row. They reached the All-Ireland final that year only to be defeated by Meath. In 1988 Cork were defeated by Meath for the second consecutive year after a replay. Having lost the previous two All-Ireland finals Cork were even hungrier for achievement in 1989. That year they captured the National Football League before facing Mayo in the championship decider. The game ended in victory for Cork who claimed their fifth-ever All-Ireland title. In 1990 Cork squared up to Meath in the All-Ireland final for the third time in four years. In a close game, Cork emerged victorious by two points to claim a second consecutive championship.

Cork surrendered their provincial title for the next two years, however, they reclaimed it in 1993.  That year they reached another All-Ireland final; however, it was Derry who won their first All-Ireland title on that occasion. Cork won the next two Munster titles as well; however, they were later defeated in the All-Ireland semi-final on both those occasions. The defeat in 1995 brought an end to one of Cork's greatest-ever periods in football history. Four years later in 1999 Cork won the Munster title for the fifth time of the decade. They later faced old rivals, Meath, in the All-Ireland final; however, victory went to the Leinster men on that occasion.

21st century
While it was expected that the team would build on the success of 1999, Cork went into decline as Kerry began to dominate in Munster. In 2002 Cork triumphed again and captured the Munster title after a victory over Tipperary in a replay. The subsequent All-Ireland semi-final saw Cork take on Kerry. It was a historic occasion as it was the first time that the two sides had met in Croke Park. Unfortunately, Cork was trounced on a scoreline of 3–19 to 2–7. The year ended with the Cork hurling team going on strike. In turn, the football team joined in a sympathy strike. The players, who had been seeking better conditions, refused to play or train with the county again until the dispute with the county board was resolved. The player's demands included having their own doctor at all Championship and League games, resolving disputes over travel arrangements and providing players with free gymnasium access. The strike was eventually resolved and all the demands were met.

Following the strike, the fortunes of the Cork football team took a turn for the worse. A series of defeats in 2003 and 2004 saw the Cork football team almost at an all-time low. In 2005 Cork narrowly lost the Munster final but qualified for the All-Ireland semi-final where Kerry was again waiting. The scoreline of 1–19 to 1–9 in favour of the men from the Kingdom tells its own story. In 2006 Cork won their first Munster title in four years following a defeat of Kerry.  The two sides met again in the All-Ireland semi-final; however, in a similar pattern Kerry was victorious. In 2007 Cork lost their Munster crown to Kerry; however, they made use of the qualifiers and found themselves in the All-Ireland final. Kerry, the old rivals, provided the opposition in the first all-Munster All-Ireland final. The game started on a level pegging; however, Kerry ran riot and captured the title with a 3–13 to 1–9 victory. It was one of Cork's most humiliating defeats.

The Cork senior footballers and hurlers withdrew their services for almost 100 days from November 2007 until February 2008. For more on this see 2007–2008 Cork players' strike. In spite of this, Cork reached the All-Ireland SFC semi-final where they lost to old rivals Kerry after a replay. Cork retained the Munster SFC title in 2009. The team advanced to the 2009 All-Ireland SFC Final, overcoming 2008 All-Ireland SFC champions Tyrone along the way. Cork lost that game to Kerry by a scoreline of 1–9 to 0–16.

In April 2010, Cork won the National Football League Division 1 title with a 1–17 to 0–12 win against Mayo at Croke Park, in front of a crowd of 27,005.

On 19 September 2010, Cork won the All Ireland SFC football title, defeating Down at Croke Park by a scoreline of 0–16 to 0–15. In April 2011, Cork retained the National Football League after a 0-21 to 2-14 win against Dublin.

Rivalries and supporters

In football, Kerry are undoubtedly Cork's biggest rivals as they meet year in year out in the Munster Senior Football Championship and recently in the All-Ireland series of games as well. Kerry are traditionally dominant, having won the Munster Championship over 75 times, while Cork have less than 40 titles. Kerry are similarly dominant in terms of All-Irelands won, topping the list with 38 titles as of their 2022 win while Cork have had seven titles with their 2010 triumph being the most recent.

The Cork footballers have also shared a rivalry with Meath in the past, though the intensity of this lowered during the 2010s as the two teams did not meet in the Championship for a number of years following the 1999 All-Ireland Final. The teams did not meet again until 2007, as the two counties met in the semi-final. Meath went into the match as favorites but Cork came out on top, setting up a final against Kerry.

Cork football support generally tends to be smaller compared to the support for the county's hurlers. However the Cork footballers enjoy the largest following in Munster. The Cork footballers possibly don't get the same level of support as their hurling counterparts because of their comparative lack of success. This is despite Cork being the fifth most successful football county in Ireland. Cork and Kerry well always draw 30,000 plus and Fitzgerald Stadium in Killarney is often a favorite among rebel supporters. In 2009 large crowds attended games against, Limerick and Tyrone, as well as the All-Ireland final against Kerry, to see a Cork team that were considered to be serious title contenders.

Roy Keane, the former association football player, has attended Cork games.

Current management team
Ratified mid-season in April 2022:
Manager: John Cleary (interim manager)
Selectors: Ray Keane (MTU/St Finbarr's), Barry Corkery (Éire Óg), James Loughrey (Mallow), Mícheál Ó Cróinín (Naomh Abán)
Coach: Kevin Walsh, announced November 2022
Performance coach: Rob Heffernan, announced November 2022

Current panel

INJ Player has had an injury which has affected recent involvement with the county team.
RET Player has since retired from the county team.
WD Player has since withdrawn from the county team due to a non-injury issue.

Managerial history
Cork — like Dublin, Kerry and Tyrone — traditionally appoints managers from inside, rather than seeking a "foreign" appointment.

P. Healy 2015–2017

R. McCarthy 2017–21

K. Ricken 2021–22

J. Cleary 2022–

Players

Notable players

Records

Texaco Footballer of the Year winners

1973: Billy Morgan
1989: Teddy McCarthy
1990: Shea Fahy

All Stars

Colours and crest

Kit evolution
Cork launched a new jersey ahead of the 2019 season, featuring a different sleeve and without white stripes down the side.

Cork launched a new jersey ahead of the 2021 season.

Cork launched a new jersey ahead of the 2023 season, with a noticeably whiter sleeve.

Team sponsorship
Cork was sponsored by O2 for 15 years. This arrangement ended on 31 December 2012. In 2013, Chill Insurance announced it would sponsor Cork in a three-year deal. Chill Insurance remained as sponsor for eight years until the end of 2020. Cork admitted in early 2021 that it had concluded a five-year deal with Sports Direct in December 2020, following public reports ahead of the intended launch. Following publication, it was subsequently confirmed that all negotiations were held with Sports Direct's Dublin-based marketing division, with no involvement from the British part of the company or from Mike Ashley, the billionaire owner of an English association football club with links to the company.

Competitive record

Head-to-head record
Every Munster and All-Ireland SFC result since 2013, as of 27 June 2022.

Results and fixtures

Results

Honours

National
All-Ireland Senior Football Championship
 Winners (7): 1890, 1911, 1945, 1973, 1989, 1990, 2010
 Runners-up (16): 1891, 1893, 1894, 1897, 1899, 1906, 1907, 1956, 1957, 1967, 1987, 1988, 1993, 1999, 2007, 2009
National Football League
 Winners (8): 1951–52, 1955–56, 1979–80, 1988–89, 1998–99, 2010, 2011, 2012
 Runners-up (6): 1931–32, 1947–48, 1978–79, 1981–82, 1996–97, 2015
National Football League Division 2
 Winners (1): 2009
National Football League Division 3
 Winners (1): 2020
All-Ireland Under-21 Football Championship
 Winners (11): 1970, 1971, 1980, 1981, 1984, 1985, 1986, 1989, 1994, 2007, 2009
 Runners-up (5): 1965, 1979, 2006, 2013, 2016
All-Ireland Under-20 Football Championship
 Winners (1): 2019
All-Ireland Minor Football Championship
 Winners (11): 1961, 1967, 1968, 1969, 1972, 1974, 1981, 1991, 1993, 2000, 2019
 Runners-up (9): 1960, 1964, 1971, 1976, 1983, 1985, 1986, 1987, 2010 
All-Ireland Junior Football Championship
 Winners (17):  1951, 1953, 1955, 1964, 1972, 1984, 1987, 1989, 1990, 1993, 1996, 2001, 2005, 2007, 2009, 2011, 2013
All-Ireland Vocational Schools Championship
 Winners (6): 1961 (Cork City), 1991, 1994, 2008, 2010, 2012

Provincial
Munster Senior Football Championship
 Winners (37): 1890, 1891, 1893, 1894, 1897, 1899, 1901, 1906, 1907, 1911, 1916, 1928, 1943, 1945, 1949, 1952, 1956, 1957, 1966, 1967, 1971, 1973, 1974, 1983, 1987, 1988, 1989, 1990, 1993, 1994, 1995, 1999, 2002, 2006, 2008, 2009, 2012
 Runners-up (54): 1889, 1892, 1898, 1903, 1909, 1910, 1913, 1914, 1917, 1935, 1938, 1942, 1947, 1948, 1950, 1951, 1953, 1954, 1955, 1958, 1959, 1961, 1962, 1963, 1964, 1968, 1969, 1970, 1972, 1975, 1976, 1977, 1978, 1979, 1980, 1981, 1982, 1984, 1985, 1986, 1996, 2000, 2001, 2005, 2007, 2011, 2013, 2014, 2015, 2017, 2018, 2019, 2020, 2021
Munster Football League
 Winners (2): 1931–32, 1932–33
 Runners-up (1): 1934–35
McGrath Cup
 Winners (9): 1998, 1999, 2006, 2007, 2009, 2012, 2014, 2016, 2018
Munster Junior Football Championship
 Winners (28): 1911, 1932, 1933, 1940, 1951, 1953, 1955, 1957, 1962, 1964, 1966, 1970, 1971, 1972, 1984, 1986, 1987, 1989, 1990, 1992, 1993, 1996, 2001, 2005, 2007, 2009, 2011, 2013
Munster Under-21 Football Championship
 Winners (26): 1963, 1965, 1969, 1970, 1971, 1974, 1979, 1980, 1981, 1982, 1984, 1985, 1986, 1989, 1994, 2001, 2004, 2005, 2006, 2007, 2009, 2011, 2012, 2013, 2014, 2016
 Runners-up (18): 1962, 1966, 1972, 1973, 1976, 1977, 1978, 1983, 1990, 1991, 1992, 1997, 1999, 2015, 2017, 2018, 2020, 2022 
Munster Minor Football Championship
 Winners (31): 1939, 1952, 1959, 1960, 1961, 1964, 1966, 1967, 1968, 1969, 1971, 1972, 1973, 1974, 1976, 1977, 1981, 1983, 1985, 1986, 1987, 1991, 1992, 1993, 1999, 2000, 2005, 2007, 2010, 2021, 2022
 Runners-up (33): 1932, 1933, 1935, 1938, 1945, 1947, 1948, 1949, 1951, 1953, 1954, 1957, 1962, 1963, 1965, 1970, 1975, 1978, 1979, 1980, 1982, 1988, 1989, 1990, 1995, 1996, 2001, 2003, 2004, 2011, 2014, 2016, 2019

References

 
County football teams